Birmingham is an unincorporated community in Franklin Township, Jackson County, Kansas, United States.

History
A post office was opened in Birmingham in 1888, and remained in operation until it was discontinued in 1942.

References

Further reading

External links
 Jackson County maps: Current, Historic, KDOT

Unincorporated communities in Jackson County, Kansas
Unincorporated communities in Kansas